Ra's al-'Ayn camps (also Ras ul-Ain camps) were desert death camps near Ra's al-'Ayn city, where many Armenians were deported and slaughtered during the Armenian genocide. The site became "synonymous with Armenian suffering".

History
Ras al-Ayn became a major collecting place for deported Armenians from Anatolia. By September 1915, groups of refugees (usually made up of women and children) began to arrive after the exhausting journey. In April 1916 the German consul reported "again massacre at Ras ul Ain": "300 to 500 deportees are taken out of the concentration camp each day and butchered at a distance of 10 km. from Ras ul Ain" In the summer of 1916 new rounds of massacres were improvised by the Turkish government in the areas of Deir ez-Zor, Rakka and Ras ul-Ain.. In 1916, over 80,000 of Armenians were slaughtered in Ras al-Ayn. According to reports, in one day alone 300-400 women arrived to the camps completely naked and were plundered by Chechens and gendarmerie: "All the bodies, without exception, were entirely naked and the wounds that had been inflicted showed that the victims had been killed, after having been subjected to unspeakable brutalities". The local  (governor) ordered the massacre of deported Armenians. Daurri (Diirri) Bey, son of the Turkish Bey of Aleppo Defterdar Djemal, was the official High Executioner of Armenians at Ras-el-Ain: "this brute, after robbing them of their jewelry chose the youngest girls of good families and kept them for a harem".

An Armenian eyewitness wrote that:

Several times, entire camps in Ras ul-Ayn were liquidated as a prevention against typhoid epidemics. According to US Ambassador Henry Morgenthau, Sr., the route to Ras-ul-Ain for Armenian travellers "was one prolonged horror".

Famous deportees
Aram Andonian
Hovhannes Kımpetyan (1894-1915), a poet and educator, perished during the deportation in Ras ul-Ain at the age of twenty one.

In popular culture

Some scenes in the 2014 movie The Cut use a representation of the camp.

See also
 Death march
 Deir ez-Zor Camps
 Armenians in Syria

References

Bibliography

External links
 Photos from Ras ul-Ain camps

Armenian genocide extermination centers
20th century in Syria
Christianity in the Ottoman Empire